The National Coalition Government of the Union of Burma (NCGUB) was an administration which claimed to be the government in exile of Burma (Myanmar). It had its headquarters in Rockville, Maryland, United States. It was formally established in December 1990, with Sein Win as its first prime minister. It was dissolved in September 2012.

History 
On 18 December 1990, in Manerplaw, the National League for Democracy (NLD) and the other opposition parties of Burma established the National Coalition Government of the Union of Burma, and elected Sein Win, a first cousin of Aung San Suu Kyi, as its prime minister.

A newer version, the Democratic Government of Burma, replaced the original structure in Bommersvik, Sweden at the special convention held there from 16–23 July 1995. In a press release, embargoed until 27 July 1995, the Elected Representatives of Burma issued the following communiqué:

On September 14, 2012, NCGUB was officially dissolved to aid the reform process in Burma.

Government structure

Cabinet

Party name abbreviations

Chairmen

State representation

Electoral constituencies

Politics and actions

The Bommersvik Declarations
Subsequent to the 1995 convention the Elected Representatives of the Union of Burma returned to Bommersvik in 2002. The following two landmark declarations were the product of their deliberations.

Bommersvik Declaration I
In 1995, during the first convention that lasted from 16–23 July, the Representatives issued the Bommersvik Declaration I with the following preamble:

Bommersvik Declaration II
In 2002, during the second convention that lasted from 25 February to 1 March, the Representatives issued the Bommersvik Declaration II with the following introductory passage:

Proposed constitution 
The NCGUB Proposed First Draft Constitution was published by the National Council of the Union of Burma (NCUB) in December 1997 with the following preamble:

References

External links 

Official website of the NCGUB and the MPU
Democratic Voice of Burma
Burma Lawyers' Council
Burma Project
Free Burma
Online Burma Library
US Campaign for Burma

Exile organizations
Former governments in exile
Burmese democracy movements
Politics of Myanmar
Rockville, Maryland